Brice Guyart (born 15 March 1981 in Suresnes) is a foil fencer from France. He won a gold medal in the team foil event at the 2000 Summer Olympics and a gold in the individual foil at the 2004 Summer Olympics. He is the older brother of Astrid Guyart.

Honours 
 2000 – Team Olympic Champion
 2001 – Team World Champion with France
 2001 – World Bronze Medal
 2003 – World Bronze Medal
 2004 – Olympic Champion
 2005 – Team World Champion

References

1981 births
Living people
French male foil fencers
Fencers at the 2000 Summer Olympics
Fencers at the 2004 Summer Olympics
Fencers at the 2008 Summer Olympics
Olympic fencers of France
Olympic gold medalists for France
Olympic medalists in fencing
Medalists at the 2000 Summer Olympics
Medalists at the 2004 Summer Olympics
European champions for France